The 1940 New Hampshire Wildcats football team was an American football team that represented the University of New Hampshire as a member of the New England Conference during the 1940 college football season. In its fourth year under head coach George Sauer, the team compiled a 5–3 record, outscoring their opponents 121–86. The team played its home games at Lewis Field (also known as Lewis Stadium) in Durham, New Hampshire.

Schedule

The 1940 game remains the last time that the Saint Anselm and New Hampshire football programs have met.

New Hampshire captain Matthew Flaherty was inducted to the university's athletic hall of fame in 1983. Flaherty served in World War II, was a teacher and basketball coach at nearby Dover High School, and later became a high school principal; he died in November 2004 at age 86.

References

New Hampshire
New Hampshire Wildcats football seasons
New Hampshire Wildcats football